Fashalam (also Romanized as Fashālam; also known as Pshalym) is a village in Molla Sara Rural District, in the Central District of Shaft County, Gilan Province, Iran. At the 2006 census, its population was 211, in 60 families.

References 

Populated places in Shaft County